Jerome Schutzer (January 11, 1930 - November 5, 2021) was an American lawyer and politician from New York.

Life
Schutzer was born on January 11, 1930, in the East Bronx, New York City, the son of Louis Schutzer and Fannie (Luxenberg) Schutzer. He graduated from Stuyvesant High School in 1948; from City College of New York; and from Brooklyn Law School in 1953. In 1950, he married Harriet Mohr, daughter of Assemblyman Morris Mohr (1907–1956), and they had four children.

Schutzer was a member of the New York State Assembly (Bronx Co., 3rd D.) from 1961 to 1965, sitting in the 173rd, 174th and 175th New York State Legislatures.

He was a member of the New York State Senate (33rd D.) in 1966. His principal issues included rent control, Medicare for senior citizens, free tuition at City College of New York, and greater safety for school children. He ran under the campaign slogan "My position is no tuition". In 1966 after re-apportionment, he ran in the Democratic primary of the 30th District for re-nomination, but was defeated by Harrison J. Goldin.

Afterwards, Schutzer worked as Executive Assistant in the Public Affairs Department for The New York Telephone Company. In 1985, he was serving as Assistant Vice President-Legislative Counsel for the New York Telephone Company.

He and his wife Harriet, who were happily married for nearly 66 years, retired to their home in Wellington, Florida in 1997. Jerome passed away peacefully on November 5, 2021 in Wellington, Florida with his family at his side.

References

1930 births
2021 deaths
Democratic Party New York (state) state senators
City College of New York alumni
Brooklyn Law School alumni
Democratic Party members of the New York State Assembly
Jewish American state legislators in New York (state)
Politicians from the Bronx
21st-century American Jews